The Austin City Hall, at 90 South St. in Austin, Nevada, was built in 1866, when Austin was prosperous as a new silvermining city, and served as a city hall and jail.  It has also been known as Austin Station House, as Austin American Legion Hall, and as Austin VFW Hall.  It was listed on the National Register of Historic Places in 2003.  It was deemed significant for serving Austin during most of the 1864-1881 period during which Austin was legally a city.  The building was transferred to the local Knights of Pythias chapter and extended in c.1904;  it was bought by the local American Legion chapter in 1947, and, as of 2003, continued to serve as a location for American Legion and for VFW meetings.

It is also a contributing building in the National Register-listed Austin Historic District.

References 

City and town halls on the National Register of Historic Places in Nevada
Government buildings completed in 1866
Buildings and structures in Lander County, Nevada
American Legion buildings
Knights of Pythias buildings
National Register of Historic Places in Lander County, Nevada
1866 establishments in Nevada
Individually listed contributing properties to historic districts on the National Register in Nevada
City halls in Nevada
Austin, Nevada